Diving at the Friendship Games took place in Budapest, Hungary between 16 and 19 August 1984. 4 events (2 men's and 2 women's) were contested.

Medal summary

Men's events

Women's events

Medal table

See also
 Diving at the 1984 Summer Olympics

References

Friendship Games
Friendship Games
1984 in Hungarian sport
Friendship Games
International aquatics competitions hosted by Hungary
Sport in Budapest